...Start Killing is the debut album by the Scottish technical death metal band Man Must Die released in 2004.

Track listing
"A Lesson Once Learned" - 5:27
"Indulge in Genocide" - 3:33
"Severe Facial Reconstruction" - 3:11
"All Shall Perish" - 4:57
"War On Creation" - 4:09
"Eradicate the Weak" - 3:28
"Scumkiller" - 4:52
"Kingdoms Shall Fall" - 3:41
"Faint Figure In Black" - 5:03

Credits
Joe McGlynn - vocals
Alan McFarland - guitar
Danny McNab - bass
John Lee - drums

References 

2004 debut albums
Man Must Die albums